Tallahala, also known as Macedonia, is an unincorporated community in Perry County, in the U.S. state of Mississippi.

History
The community takes its name from Tallahala Creek.

References

Unincorporated communities in Mississippi
Unincorporated communities in Perry County, Mississippi
Mississippi placenames of Native American origin